Owl Creek is a stream in southeastern Knox County in the U.S. state of Missouri. It is a tributary of the North River.

The confluence is 3/4 mile southwest of the community of Plevna.

Owl Creek was named for the presence of owls, as evidenced by the hoots heard by pioneer citizens.

See also
List of rivers of Missouri

References

Rivers of Knox County, Missouri
Rivers of Missouri